Aburidashi is a ninja technique of sending secret messages using a form of invisible ink. The technique uses ink made of juice extracted from soaked and crushed soybeans. The message becomes visible to the recipient by heating the paper.

References

Steganography
Japanese culture